In the study of liquid crystals the paranematic susceptibility (Latin: susceptibilis "receptiveness") is a quantity that describes the degree of induced order in a liquid crystal in response to an applied magnetic field. As a result of the diamagnetic anisotropy of liquid crystal molecules, nematic order can be produced by the application of a magnetic field. If a magnetic field is applied to a nematic liquid crystal in the isotropic phase then the order is given by:

The proportionality constant  is the paranematic susceptibility. The value increases as the liquid crystal is cooled towards its transition temperature. In both the mean field approximation and Landau-deGennes theory the paranematic susceptibility is proportional to  where  is the transition temperature.

References
E.B. Priestley, P.J. Wojtowicz, and P. Sheng, Introduction to Liquid Crystals, Plenum Press, 1974. 

Liquid crystals